John White House may refer to:

John W. White House, Russellville, Arkansas, listed on the National Register of Historic Places in Pope County, Arkansas
John White House (Lawrenceville, New Jersey), listed on the National Register of Historic Places in Mercer County, New Jersey
John White House (Chartiers Township, Pennsylvania), listed on the National Register of Historic Places in Washington County, Pennsylvania
John M. White House, Fort Mill, South Carolina, listed on the National Register of Historic Places in York County, South Carolina